Kesinga is a town and a notified area committee in Kalahandi district in the Indian state of Odisha, near India's east coast. It is also called the gate to Kalahandi. Kesinga is rich in agriculture, small industries, and start-ups as well.

Geography
River Tel and Uteh meet not very far from Kesinga, providing appreciable ground for summer sand crops (cucumber, watermelon etc.). Another landmark of Kesinga is Budhadangar (old mountain) in the middle of the town. This mountain has a profound effect on the climate of Kesinga.

Transport
Kesinga is the major railhead in the Kalahandi district. It is considered the gateway of Kalahandi.

National Highway 26 passes through the town. Kesinga is well connected to major cities and towns in Odisha.

Village in Kesinga Block 
Balsi, Kandel and Kurlupada are villages in Kesinga block of Kalahandi district in Odisha. Boringpadar is the neighbour village of Kesinga. Positioned in a rural area of the Kalahandi district of Odisha, it is among the 106 villages of Kesinga block of Kalahandi district. As per the administration register, the village number of Balsi is 422360. The village has 510 homes.
According to Census 2011, Balsi's population is 1799, of which 888 are women, and 911 are men. This village has 254 kids in the age group of 0-6 years, of which 120 are girls, and 134 are boys.

Economy
Apart from being a railhead for the region, Kesinga also serves as an enormous business activity. It is the surrounding area's economic heart, where farmers can get a fair price for produce. There are scores of rice mills in Kesinga. A godown of FCI provides farmers and rice mill owners with a storage solution.

Industries
Kesinga has a handful of small and middle-scale industries providing goods from daily needs to industrial applications to the state of Odisha and nearby states. Many rice mills are operating in Kurlupada and Bagad region.

School and College in Kesinga
Kesinga Vidyapitha, Kesinga is the purely oldest School in Kesinga. It is also known as Boy's High School.

Government Girls High School Kesinga is the Oldest School.

Kesinga Mahavidyalaya, Kesinga is oldest College in Kesinga Region Kalahandi District. It is affiliated by Sambalpur University Art's All Hons Subject Available Here. Numerous private institutions are also operating here; the leading ones are Saraswati Shishu Vidyamandir, Young Blood Public School, The Dronacharya School, Little Genius School and many more.

References
–

Cities and towns in Kalahandi district